Thomas Cook Airlines Canada was the Canadian charter brand of Thomas Cook Airlines. It was based in Montreal, Quebec, Canada. The airline served destinations to the Caribbean, Mexico, and to North America.

History
Operations began on 5 November 2010 for the tour operator Sunquest Vacations. The airline operated with leased Boeing 757 aircraft from other airlines within the Thomas Cook Group, primarily from Thomas Cook Airlines. Those aircraft in turn were operated by Jazz, though still operated under the name Thomas Cook Airlines Canada. Numerous flights operated using Thomas Cook Airlines’s IATA, ICAO, and callsign.

The Thomas Cook Group ended up selling Sunquest Vacations to Red Label Vacations in early 2013, thus ending the flight service agreement with Jazz. This effectively led to the airline ceasing all operations.

Destinations 

At the time of the closure, Thomas Cook Airlines Canada was flying to various destinations in the Caribbean, Mexico, and to North America.

Fleet

Before the end of the flight service agreement, Thomas Cook Airlines Canada operated the following aircraft:

See also
List of defunct airlines of Canada

References

Defunct airlines of Canada
Airlines established in 2010
Airlines disestablished in 2012
Regional airlines of Quebec
Canadian companies established in 2010
Canadian companies disestablished in 2012
Defunct charter airlines